Ardleigh Reservoir is a  lake near Colchester in Essex, England constructed in the valley of the Salary Brook. It supplies water both to Anglian Water and to Affinity Water. The lake is also used for recreational activities including sailing and angling.

History 
The South Essex Waterworks Company, the Southend Waterworks Company and several other water undertakings in Essex sought powers in 1969 to increase the security of the supply of drinking water. A draft Water Order was made and a public inquiry was held in December 1969.

The Essex River and South Essex Water Act 1969 received Royal Assent on 25 July 1969. Under the terms of the Act the Essex River Authority constructed the Cattawade Barrage Works to prevent salt water entering the lower reaches of the River Stour. The South Essex Waterworks Company built a water intake upstream of the barrage, a pumping station at Brantham, and a pipeline to the new Ardleigh reservoir.

The South Essex Waterworks Company and the Southend Waterworks Company merged to form the Essex Water Company in 1970.

Operation 
The reservoir is operated by the Ardleigh Reservoir Committee which is owned jointly by Affinity Water (formerly Veolia Water East) and Anglian Water.

The reservoir receives large volumes of water from the East Mills intake (51°53'28.8"N 0°54'54.8"E) on the River Colne and the Northern and Western Salary Brooks in the direct reservoir catchment of about 12 km2. The River Colne's catchment area is approximately 256 km2.

The associated Ardleigh water treatment works (51°54'59.3"N 0°57'43.3"E), treats and supplies 14 million litres per day of drinking water to 133,000 customers. The treatment plant has included Dissolved Air Flotation (DAF), Granular Activated Carbon (GAC) filters, ozone dosing, Rapid Gravity Filters (RGF) and Actiflo technology. The peak output of Ardleigh treatment works is 36 million litres per day (2018).

In 2011 SRC Aggregates planned to remove 4 million tonnes of gravel from a site adjacent to the Ardleigh reservoir to eventually create a new reservoir of 1.8 million. Gravel extraction was thought to take 15 years.

Recreation 
Both game and coarse fish are present including pike and zander.

Ardleigh Reservoir is also home to the University of Essex Rowing Club.

References 

Reservoirs in Essex
Drinking water reservoirs in England